The Maidan, also referred to as the Brigade Parade Ground, is a large public park and urban green space in the center of Kolkata, India. It is a vast stretch of field that includes numerous sporting grounds, including the famous cricketing venue Eden Gardens, several football stadiums and the Kolkata Race Course. The Maidan is also dotted with many statues and architectural works, the most notable being the Victoria Memorial. Due to the freshness and greenery it provides to the metropolis, it has been referred to as the "lungs of Kolkata".

The property of the Indian Army, the Maidan hosts the army's Eastern zone high command in historic Fort William. The Maidan stretches from the Raj Bhavan building on the Esplanade in the north to the National Library on Belvedere Road in Alipore in the south. The wide field stretches from the Hooghly River in the west to the Victoria Memorial in the east. The park is considered the historical and cultural center of Kolkata, as well as one of the city's most popular tourist attractions and a hub of leisure and entertainment for Calcuttans.

History

In 1758, one year after their decisive win in Battle of Plassey, the British East India Company commenced construction of the new Fort William in the center of the village Gobindapur. The inhabitants of the village were compensated and provided with land in Taltala, Kumartuli and Shovabazar. The fort was completed in 1773.

In 1883–1884 the Maidan, along with grounds of the Indian Museum, hosted the Calcutta International Exhibition.

In 1909, H.E.A. Cotton wrote,

In Bengali, the maidan is called 'Garh-er maath'. 'Garh', in Bengali, means fort and its meaning literally translates to the 'fort's ground'.

Around the Maidan

On Council House Street, at one corner of the Maidan, was the long-defunct Fort William College, which played a pioneering role in the development of many of the Indian languages, particularly Bengali.

The cricket stadium at Eden Gardens was built in stages. Amongst the later additions are Netaji Indoor Stadium, the M.P. Birla Planetarium, Rabindra Sadan, the Academy of Fine Arts and Nandan. The metro stations bordering the Maidan as one travels from the south are Victoria (under construction), Rabindra Sadan, Maidan, Park Street and Esplanade.

The Howrah Bridge is away from the Maidan, but the Vidyasagar Setu (Second Hooghly Bridge) overlooks at least one corner of the Maidan and Fort William.

Statues

The Maidan was dotted with statues of British governor generals and other eminent personalities of the British Raj, including Lord Curzon, Kitchener, Roberts, Minto, Northbrook, Canning and others who had known Kolkata well. Two or three of them were erected in the first few years of Indian independence in 1947; it was not until 1983 that the last 16 were removed.

Events

Political rallies
Geoffrey Moorhouse in 1978 presents a vivid description of a Communist Party of India (Marxist) (CPI(M)) rally on the Maidan:

Book fair controversy

In 2005, The Statesman, a leading Kolkata newspaper wrote,

Life on the Maidan

The second oldest cricket club named Calcutta Cricket Club was founded in Maidan in 1792, where football and rugby are currently practiced. The world's oldest hockey tournament, Beighton Cup, was instituted in 1895 and is usually held on the Mohun Bagan ground in the Maidan. For the Indian Football Association, the Maidan has been the nerve centre.

Police district
Maidan police station is part of the South division of Kolkata Police.

Tollygunge Women's police station has jurisdiction over all the police districts in the South Division, i.e. Park Street, Shakespeare Sarani, Alipore, Hastings, Maidan, Bhowanipore, Kalighat, Tollygunge, Charu Market, New Alipur and Chetla.

References

External links

Parks in Kolkata
Tourist attractions in Kolkata
Maidans in India
World's fair sites in India